Havøya is an island in Måsøy Municipality in Troms og Finnmark county, Norway. The island lies just off the coast of the Porsanger Peninsula with the island of Hjelmsøya to the north, Måsøya to the east, and Rolvsøya to the west. The only village on the island is Havøysund on the southern part of the island. Havøysund is the administrative centre of Måsøy Municipality, and it is the main population centre of the municipality. The island is connected to the mainland by the Havøysund Bridge along Norwegian County Road 889.

Norsk Hydro has built a windmill park on the northwestern part of the island, which has become a landmark for people at sea. The 15 windmills take 30 minutes by foot to reach from the town and are located on Havøygavlen, the highest point on the island. The Arctic view cafe and viewing area is located on the northwestern end of the island, near the windmill park, and it provides an undisturbed view towards the Barents Sea and to the surrounding arctic archipelago of Måsøya, Hjelmsøya, Ingøya, and Rolvsøya.

See also
List of islands of Norway

References

Måsøy
Islands of Troms og Finnmark